Novaya Golovinka is a rural locality in Verkhnelyubazhsky Selsoviet Rural Settlement, Fatezhsky District, Kursk Oblast, Russia. The population as of 2010 is 18.

Geography 
The village is located in the Yasenok River basin (a right tributary of the Svapa River), 106 km from the Russia–Ukraine border, 63 km north-west of Kursk, 18 km north-west of the district center – the town Fatezh, 4 km from the selsoviet center – Verkhny Lyubazh.

Climate
Novaya Golovinka has a warm-summer humid continental climate (Dfb in the Köppen climate classification).

Transport 
Novaya Golovinka is located 1.5 km from the federal route  Crimea Highway (a part of the European route ), 24.5 km from the route  (a part of the European route ), 2 km from the road of intermunicipal significance  (M2 "Crimea Highway" – Yasenok), 25.5 km from the nearest railway station Kurbakinskaya (railway line Arbuzovo – Luzhki-Orlovskiye).

The rural locality is situated 65 km from Kursk Vostochny Airport, 186 km from Belgorod International Airport and 240 km from Voronezh Peter the Great Airport.

References

Notes

Sources

Rural localities in Fatezhsky District